Eodelphis, from eo- plus []delphis, thus meaning "very early opossum", is a genus of stagodont metatherians from the Late Cretaceous of North America, with distinctive crushing dentition. Named species include E. browni and the more advanced E. cutleri. Both come from the Late Campanian (Judithian "Land Mammal Age") of Dinosaur Provincial Park, Alberta. Specimens are also known from the Judith River Formation of Montana. E. cutleri is related to the Maastrichtian genus Didelphodon as indicated by its enlarged premolars and more robust jaw. Eodelphis was probably an aquatic predator like its relative Didelphodon, and may have weighed about 0.6 kg (1.3 lb), making it one of the largest mammals of its time.

References

 Cifelli, R. L., Z.-X. Luo, et al. (2004). Mammals from the Age of Dinosaurs: Origins, Evolution and Structure. New York, Columbia University Press.
 Clemens, W. A., Jr. (1979). Marsupialia. Mesozoic mammals: the first two-thirds of mammalian history. J. A. Lilligraven, Kielan-Jaworowska and W. A. Clemens, Jr. Berkeley, University of California Press: 192–220.
 Matthew, W. D. (1916). "A marsupial from the Belly River Cretaceous. With critical observations upon the affinities of the Cretaceous mammals." Bulletin of the American Museum of Natural History 35: 477–500.
 Sahni, A. (1972). "The vertebrate fauna of the Judith River Formation, Montana." Bulletin of the American Museum of Natural History 147(6): 323–412.
 Smith Woodward, A. (1916). "On a mammalian mandible (Cimolestes cutleri) from an Upper Cretaceous formation in Alberta, Canada." Proceedings of the Zoological Society of London 158: 525–528.

Prehistoric metatherians
Late Cretaceous mammals of North America
Fossil taxa described in 1916
Prehistoric mammal genera